Claire Nicolas White (June 18, 1925 – May 26, 2020) was an American poet, novelist and translator of Dutch literature. She was a niece of Aldous Huxley and the granddaughter-in-law of architect Stanford White.

Life
White was born in Groet, Netherlands, the daughter of Joep Nicolas, a Dutch stained-glass artist who emigrated to America just before World War II. She grew up in the European exile community in New York City. Her husband, the sculptor Robert White, was a grandson of Stanford White.

White's literary papers are held by Stony Brook University.

Works

Translations
 (tr. with Louise Varèse) The Time of Our Lives (Journal d'une petite fille) by Martine Rouchaud, 1946.
 The Assault by Harry Mulisch, 1985. Translated from the Dutch.
 A Night in May (La Nuit de mai) by Alfred de Musset, 1989. Translated from the French.
Translated from the Dutch (5 of the 7 poems). 
 The Vanishing by Tim Krabbé, 1993. Translated from the Dutch.
 My Father's War: A Novel by Adriaan van Dis, 1996. Translated from the Dutch.

Other
 Joep Nicolas: leven en werk, 1979
 The Bridge, 1987
 River Boy, 1988
 (ed.) Stanford White: Letters to His Family : including a selection of letters to Augustus Saint-Gaudens, 1997

References

1925 births
2020 deaths
20th-century American poets
20th-century American novelists
Dutch emigrants to the United States
Dutch–English translators
American women poets
American women novelists
20th-century American women writers
20th-century American translators
Stanford White family